Niclas may refer to:

Abraham Niclas Edelcrantz (1754–1821), Finnish born Swedish poet and inventor
Jacob Niclas Ahlström (1805–1857), Swedish Kapellmeister and composer
Johan Niclas Byström (1783–1848), Swedish sculptor
Niclas Alexandersson (born 1971), retired Swedish football midfielder
Niclas Andersén (born 1988), Swedish ice hockey player
Niclas Bendixen, Danish actor, dancer and choreographer
Niclas Edman (born 1991), Swedish ice hockey player
Niclas Fasth (born 1972), Swedish professional golfer
Niclas Frisk (born 1969), Swedish musician
Niclas Hävelid (born 1973), professional ice hockey defenceman
Niclas Jensen (born 1974), Danish professional football player
Niclas Jönsson (born 1967), former driver in the Indy Racing League
Niclas Kindvall (born 1967), retired Swedish football player
Niclas Levein (born 1988), retired Swedish ice hockey player
Niclas Lucenius (born 1989), Finnish professional ice hockey center
Niclas Olofsson (born 1975), former floorball goalkeeper
Niclas Rasck (born 1969), former Swedish football defender
Niclas Sahlgren (1701–1776), Swedish merchant and philanthropist
Niclas Wahlgren (born 1965), Swedish singer
Niclas Wallin (born 1975), professional ice hockey player
Niclas Weiland (born 1972), retired German football player
Niclas, Graf von Abensberg (1441–1485), knight and nobleman under the reign of Louis IX, Duke of Bavaria-Landshut
Niclas Jonasson (born 1976), Swedish orienteering competitor and world champion
Thomas Evan Nicholas (Niclas y Glais) (1879–1971), Welsh language poet, preacher, radical and champion of the disadvantaged of society